Proverbs 26 is the 26th chapter of the Book of Proverbs in the Hebrew Bible or the Old Testament of the Christian Bible. The book is a compilation of several wisdom literature collections, with the heading in 1:1 may be intended to regard Solomon as the traditional author of the whole book, but the dates of the individual collections are difficult to determine, and the book probably obtained its final shape in the post-exilic period. This chapter is the last part of the fifth collection of the book, so-called "the Second Solomonic Collection."

Text
The original text is written in Hebrew language. This chapter is divided into 28 verses.

Textual witnesses
Some early manuscripts containing the text of this chapter in Hebrew are of the Masoretic Text, which includes the Aleppo Codex (10th century), and Codex Leningradensis (1008). 

There is also a translation into Koine Greek known as the Septuagint, made in the last few centuries BC; some extant ancient manuscripts of this version include Codex Vaticanus (B; B; 4th century), Codex Sinaiticus (S; BHK: S; 4th century), and Codex Alexandrinus (A; A; 5th century).

Analysis
This chapter belongs to a further collection of Solomonic proverbs, transmitted and
edited by royal scribes during the reign of Hezekiah, comprising Proverbs  25–29. Based on differences in style and subject-matter there could be two originally separate collections: 
 Proverbs 25–27: characterized by many similes and the 'earthy' tone
 Proverbs 28–29: characterized by many antithetical sayings and the predominantly 'moral and religious' tone (cf. Proverbs 10–15)

The first twelve verses of this chapter, except verse 2, "Like a flitting sparrow, like a flying swallow, so a curse without cause shall not alight", form a series of sayings on the 'fool', so sometimes are called “the Book of Fools”.

Verse 1
Like snow in summer or rain in harvest,
so honor is not fitting for a fool.
"Honor": may likely refer to "respect, external recognition of worth, accolades, advancement to high position", etc., all of which would be 'out of place with a fool'.

Verse 17
He who passes by and meddles with strife not belonging to him
is like one who takes a dog by the ears.

See also

Related Bible parts: Exodus 22, Leviticus 25, Proverbs 10, Proverbs 15, Proverbs 25

References

Sources

External links
 Jewish translations:
 Mishlei - Proverbs - Chapter 26 (Judaica Press) translation [with Rashi's commentary] at Chabad.org
 Christian translations:
 Online Bible at GospelHall.org (ESV, KJV, Darby, American Standard Version, Bible in Basic English)
 Book of Proverbs Chapter 26 King James Version
  Various versions

26